Jenzat is a commune in the Allier department in central France.

Population

Neighboring Communities

There are six neighboring townships surrounding Jenzat:

 Charroux 
 Saint-Bonnet-de-Rochefort 
 Mazerier 
 Saulzet 
 Le Mayet-d'Ecole 
 Saint-Germain-de-Salles

See also
Communes of the Allier department

References

Communes of Allier
Allier communes articles needing translation from French Wikipedia